Beaver (Ts'aahudaaneekk'onh Denh  in Koyukon) is a census-designated place (CDP) in Yukon-Koyukuk Census Area, Alaska, United States. At the 2010 census the population was 84, unchanged from 2000.

Geography

Demographics

Beaver first appeared on the 1930 U.S. Census as an unincorporated village. It is unusual for having had just three different population figures on 7 out of 9 censuses (103 in 1930 & 1990; 101 in 1950-70 & 84 in 2000-10) and an identical (unchanged) population on 5 different censuses (101 in 1950, 1960 & 1970 and 84 in 2000 and 2010). Beaver became a census-designated place (CDP) in 1980.

As of the census of 2000, there were 84 people, 31 households, and 19 families residing in the CDP. The population density was 4.1 people per square mile (1.6/km2). There were 54 housing units at an average density of 2.6/sq mi (1.0/km2). The racial makeup of the CDP was 4.76% White, 85.71% Native American, and 9.52% from two or more races.

There were 31 households, out of which 41.9% had children under the age of 18 living with them, 12.9% were married couples living together, 32.3% had a female householder with no husband present, and 38.7% were non-families. 29.0% of all households were made up of individuals, and 6.5% had someone living alone who was 65 years of age or older. The average household size was 2.71 and the average family size was 3.42.

In the CDP, the population was spread out, with 40.5% under the age of 18, 4.8% from 18 to 24, 32.1% from 25 to 44, 15.5% from 45 to 64, and 7.1% who were 65 years of age or older. The median age was 29 years. For every 100 females, there were 154.5 males. For every 100 females age 18 and over, there were 163.2 males.

The median income for a household in the CDP was $28,750, and the median income for a family was $29,792. Males had a median income of $26,667 versus $16,875 for females. The per capita income for the CDP was $8,441. There were no families and 11.1% of the population living below the poverty line, including no under eighteens and none of those over 64.

Education
Yukon Flats School District operates the Cruikshank School.

See also

 List of census-designated places in Alaska

References

External links

Census-designated places in Alaska
Census-designated places in Unorganized Borough, Alaska
Census-designated places in Yukon–Koyukuk Census Area, Alaska
Yukon River